Shimenxian railway station is a fourth-class railway station in Shimen County, Changde, Hunan, China on the Jiaozuo–Liuzhou railway. It was built in 1978. Passenger services have been suspended since 3 July 2013 due to the better location of Shimenxian North railway station.

See also 
 Shimenxian North railway station

References 

Railway stations in Hunan
Railway stations in China opened in 1978